Rayon Lindsay Griffith (born 9 January 1979) is a West Indian cricketer who played 22 first-class and 22 list A games for Guyana between 1999 and 2007.

External links

1979 births
Living people
Guyanese cricketers
Guyana cricketers
People from Essequibo Islands-West Demerara
West Indies B cricketers